Chourmo is the second book of French author Jean-Claude Izzo's Marseilles Trilogy.

References 

1996 French novels
French crime novels
Novels about organized crime
Novels set in Marseille